The 1700s decade ran from January 1, 1700, to December 31, 1709.

The decade is marked by a shift in the political structure of the Indian subcontinent, and the decline of the Mughal Empire.

References